Angelyne (real name Ronia Tamar Goldberg, born 1950) is an American celebrity, model, entertainer. 

Angelyne may also refer to:

People and characters
 Angelyne Cilvender Toh, a beauty pageant contestant prize winner from Miss World Malaysia 2012

Fictional characters
 Angelyne, a fictional character from the film Three Men and a Baby
 Angelyne, a fictional character from the TV show Futurama; see Bender (Futurama)
 Angelyne, a fictional character from the TV show Maximum Bob

Music
 Angelyne (album), a 1982 album by Angelyne
 "Angelyne", a 1981 song by Gary U.S. Bonds and Bruce Springsteen, from the album On the Line (Gary U.S. Bonds album)
 "Angelyne", a 2003 song by The Jayhawks, from the album Rainy Day Music

Stage and screen
 Angelyne (miniseries), a 2022 U.S. TV miniseries about Angelyne
 Angelyne, a 1995 short documentary film about Angelyne directed by Robinson Devor
 Los Angelyne, a 2009 one-woman semi-autobiographical theatre show by Katherine Saltzberg

See also

 
 Angel (disambiguation)
 Angela (disambiguation)
 Angeline (disambiguation)
 Angelina (disambiguation)
 Angelini (surname)